Valerie Harris (born 5 December 1935) is a British former swimmer. She competed in the women's 200 metre breaststroke at the 1952 Summer Olympics.

References

1935 births
Living people
British female swimmers
Olympic swimmers of Great Britain
Swimmers at the 1952 Summer Olympics
Place of birth missing (living people)
Female breaststroke swimmers